Pierre-Hugues Herbert and Nicolas Mahut defeated Lloyd Glasspool and Harri Heliövaara in the final, 4–6, 7–6(7–3), [12–10] to win the doubles tennis title at the 2022 Open Sud de France. They saved a championship point en route to their 21st career ATP Tour doubles title together. Glasspool and Heliövaara were contesting for their second title as a team.

Henri Kontinen and Édouard Roger-Vasselin were the defending champions, but only Roger-Vasselin returned and partnered with Jonathan Erlich for his title defense. The pair lost in the semifinals to Herbert and Mahut.

Seeds

Draw

Draw

References

External links
 Main draw

Open Sud de France
Doubles